The Women's normal hill individual competition of the Beijing 2022 Olympics was held on 5 February, at the Snow Ruyi hill in Zhangjiakou.

Summary
Urša Bogataj of Slovenia won the event; it was also her first Olympic medal. Katharina Althaus of Germany repeated her 2018 performance and won the silver medal, thereby becoming the first woman who won multiple Olympic medals in ski jumping. Nika Križnar, also from Slovenia, won bronze. It was Slovenia's first ever gold medal in ski jumping.

The 2018 champion, Maren Lundby, withdrew from the Olympics. The 2018 silver medalist, Althaus, and the bronze medalist, Sara Takanashi, both qualified. Ema Klinec competed as the 2021 World champion. Marita Kramer was leading the 2021–22 FIS Ski Jumping World Cup at the start of the Olympics, having won six out of eleven events before the Olympics. However, she had to withdraw from the games due to a coronavirus infection. In the World Cup ranking, she was followed by Althaus and Bogataj.

Althaus was leading after the first round, with Bogataj second and Križnar third. In the final round, Bogataj jumped six meters further than Althaus, and won the competition with an overall score of 239 points.

Qualification

Results
The final was started at 18:45.

References

Ski jumping at the 2022 Winter Olympics
Women's events at the 2022 Winter Olympics